The Temple Lot Case (also known as the Temple Lot Suit and formally known as The Reorganized Church of Jesus Christ of Latter Day Saints, complainant, v. the Church of Christ at Independence, Missouri) was a United States legal case in the 1890s which addressed legal ownership of the Temple Lot, a significant parcel of land in the Latter Day Saint movement. In the case, the Reorganized Church of Jesus Christ of Latter Day Saints (RLDS Church, now Community of Christ) claimed legal title of the land and asked the court to order the Church of Christ (Temple Lot) to cease its occupation of the property. The RLDS Church won the case at trial, but the decision was reversed on appeal.

Pre-trial ownership of Temple Lot
The Temple Lot is a small parcel of land in Independence, Missouri. In the early 1830s, the lot was designated by Joseph Smith as the site for a proposed temple for a prophesied city of "Zion" or "New Jerusalem". In 1831, Latter Day Saint Bishop Edward Partridge purchased the Temple Lot from Jones H. Flournoy and Clara Flournoy on behalf of Smith's Latter Day Saint church. Partridge held the property in trust for the church.

The proposed temple was never built on the site and the Latter Day Saints were ultimately driven out of Missouri. After this, legal title to the property became a matter of dispute, with three separate theories of who inherited legal title to the property. The Church of Christ (Temple Lot) (the "Hedrickites") ultimately found themselves in possession of the most prominent  portion of the  Bishop Partridge had purchased in 1831. On April 7, 1884, a Hedrickite conference authorized construction of a "house of worship" on the property, and on April 6, 1887, a building committee was formed and authorized by conference vote to immediately begin construction of the building. At their October 6, 1889 conference, the Hedrickites noted completion of the small church building on the northeast corner of the property, but no building was constructed on the exact site believed to have been designated for the temple—the central part of the sparsely-wooded field.

Pre-trial dispute

Observing lumber and other building materials rapidly accumulating on the site, on June 11, 1887, the RLDS Church served written notice to the Church of Christ (Temple Lot) to "cease and desist" performing any construction on the disputed site. However, construction continued and media reports of the day indicate that a habitable structure was in place as early as that summer of 1887. On September 10, 1888, visiting elders from the Utah-based the Church of Jesus Christ of Latter-day Saints (LDS Church) were welcomed and invited to lecture in the building, which apparently was completed by that time.

Trial
On August 6, 1891, the RLDS Church filed suit in the United States District Court for the Western District of Missouri claiming equitable title to the Temple Lot, which was under the control by the Temple Lot church. After Joseph Smith's death, the Latter Day Saint movement had splintered into a number of separate churches; Smith's son Joseph Smith III was the president of the RLDS Church and claimed that the RLDS Church was the rightful successor to the original Latter Day Saint church. The Temple Lot church originally claimed the property on the basis of legal title, but later in the case also argued that it was entitled to the land as the rightful successor of the original church. The Utah-based LDS Church also participated in the case, providing funds and legal advice to the Hedrickites.

Perhaps to bolster their legal claim to the property, a Hedrickite conference announced Sunday, April 9, 1893 that construction of a long-awaited Latter-day Saint Temple would begin on the disputed property. Evidently on advice of their attorney, however, the strategy was abandoned, and soon forgotten in the confusion of rumors.  The Chicago Tribune reported:

After days of hearings which commenced February 7, 1894, the trial court ruled in March 1894 that the RLDS Church was the rightful successor to the original Latter Day Saint church, and that as such it was entitled to ownership of the property. The court also held that the doctrine of laches did not apply since the Latter Day Saints had been driven out of Missouri and were therefore unable to assert their rights to the property.

Appeal
The Church of Christ (Temple Lot) appealed the trial court's decision to the United States Court of Appeals for the Eighth Circuit. The appeals court disagreed with the trial court on the issue of laches, suggesting that the RLDS Church had unnecessarily delayed in asserting its rights over the property, and that in any case the legal title claims of the Hedrickites were probably superior to those of the RLDS Church. However, rather than reversing the decision of the trial court, the appeals court dismissed the case from the courts entirely, which meant that the controversy stood as though no case had ever been brought. In the result, the Hedrickites remained in possession of the Temple Lot by default.

The RLDS Church requested a second hearing by the Court of Appeals en banc but the motion was dismissed. The RLDS Church then sought to appeal the decision to the United States Supreme Court, but that court denied certiorari, which brought the case to a close.

Reactions
Leaders of the RLDS Church widely interpreted the result of the case as a technical vindication of the church's claim as being the rightful successor to the original Latter Day Saint church. Joseph Smith III and his successor, Israel A. Smith, both argued that the RLDS Church had been denied title to the Temple Lot merely because of the doctrine of laches, and that the courts had confirmed that otherwise their title was superior. The Temple Lot church has consistently maintained that the case stands as the final validation of their right to possess the Temple Lot. The LDS Church, although it assisted the Hedrickites in the case, has not taken an official position on the outcome of the case.

Impact
The case became an important source for documents related to Mormon plural marriage. To counteract RLDS claims to be the true successors to Joseph Smith Jr., the LDS Church assisted by having women give court testimony about their polygamist relationships with him.

See also
Kirtland Temple Suit

Notes

References
The Temple Lot Case [trial and appeal transcripts] (Lamoni, Iowa: Herald Publishing House, 1893)
Bert C. Flint, An Outline History of the Church of Christ (Temple Lot) (Independence, Mo.: Church of Christ, Temple Lot, 1979)

External links
"Decision of John F. Philips, judge, in Temple Lot case : the Reorganized Church of Jesus Christ of Latter Day Saints versus the Church of Christ, et al (1894)"
Full text of Complainant's abstract of pleading and evidence in The Reorganized Church of Jesus Christ of Latter Day Saints, complainant, vs. the Church of Christ at Independence, Missouri Published in 1893 by the RLDS Herald Publishing House, 507 pages of information about the "Temple Lot Suit"

1894 in United States case law
1895 in United States case law
Community of Christ
History of the Latter Day Saint movement
Independence, Missouri
Latter Day Saint movement in Missouri
Mormonism and law
Mormonism-related controversies
United States Court of Appeals for the Eighth Circuit cases
Law articles needing an infobox
Temple Lot
1894 in Christianity
1895 in Christianity
Church of Christ (Temple Lot)
19th-century Mormonism
1895 in Missouri
Christianity and law in the 19th century